Problem finding means problem discovery. It is part of the larger problem process that includes problem shaping and problem solving. Problem finding requires intellectual vision and insight into what is missing. Problem finding plays a major role in application of creativity.

Different terms have been used for problem finding in literature including problem discovery, problem formulation, problem identification, problem construction, and problem posing. It has been studied in many fields. Mathematics and science prefer to the term problem posing.

Processes in problem finding 
Basadur distinguished problem discovery and problem formulation; then later problem generation and problem conceptualization.  Runco and Chand distinguish problem identification and problem definition.

Scholars distinguish between well-defined and ill-defined problems. Briggs and Reinig defined a well-defined solution in terms of space solution space. Pretz, Naples, and Sternberg defined a well-defined problem as one for which the parts of the solution are closely related or clearly based on the information given. Problem finding applies to ill-defined problems.

Abdulla-Alabbasi and Cramond reviewing the literature on problem finding conceptualize five processes of decreasing of ill-definedness and distinguish ideative and evaluative processes. The processes are discovery, formulation, construction, identification and definition. Problem discovery is an unconscious process which depends upon knowledge whereby an idea enters one's conscious awareness, problem formulation is the discovery of a goal; problem construction involves modifying a known problem or goal to another one; problem identification represents a problem that exists in reality but needs to be discovered (such as an unknown virus causing illness in patients); problem definition involves modifying a problem but in a mostly evaluative rather than ideative way.

References

See also

 Adaptive reasoning
 Abductive reasoning
 Analogy
 Artificial intelligence
 Brainstorming
 Common sense
 Common sense reasoning
 Creative problem solving
 Cyc
 Deductive reasoning
 Divergent thinking
 Educational psychology
 Executive function
 Facilitation (business)
 General Problem Solver
 Inductive reasoning
 Innovation
 Intelligence amplification
 Inquiry
 Morphological analysis (problem-solving)
 Newell, Allen
 PDCA
 Problem statement
 Problem structuring methods
 Research question
 Simon, Herbert
 Soar (cognitive architecture)
 Thought
 Transdisciplinarity
 TRIZ
 Troubleshooting
 Wicked problem

Problem solving